Eliran George (born 15 March 1992) is an Israeli footballer currently playing for Maccabi HaShikma Ramat Hen.

Career

Club 

George started his professional career with boyhood club, Maccabi Tel Aviv.

On August 31, 2011 George signed a contract for two years for Hapoel Haifa.

External links
 

Living people
1992 births
Jewish Israeli sportspeople
Israeli footballers
Maccabi Tel Aviv F.C. players
Hapoel Haifa F.C. players
Hakoah Maccabi Amidar Ramat Gan F.C. players
Maccabi Yavne F.C. players
Hapoel Katamon Jerusalem F.C. players
Hapoel Marmorek F.C. players
Sektzia Ness Ziona F.C. players
Ironi Tiberias F.C. players
Maccabi Kiryat Gat F.C. players
Hapoel Ironi Baqa al-Gharbiyye F.C. players
Maccabi Jaffa F.C. players
Hapoel Jerusalem F.C. players
Beitar Kfar Saba F.C. players
Hapoel Bik'at HaYarden F.C. players
Ironi Kuseife F.C. players
Maccabi HaShikma Ramat Hen F.C. players
Footballers from Hod HaSharon
Israeli Premier League players
Liga Leumit players
Israeli people of Iraqi-Jewish descent
Association football defenders